Bagong Umaga (International title: New Beginnings / ) is a Philippine television drama romance series broadcast by Kapamilya Channel. The series premiered on the network's Kapamilya Gold afternoon block and worldwide via The Filipino Channel from October 26, 2020 to April 30, 2021, replacing Love Thy Woman.

Series overview

iWantTFC shows two episodes first in advance before it broadcasts on TV.

Episodes

Season 1

References

Lists of Philippine drama television series episodes